Frederick Lorenzen Jr. (born December 30, 1934), nicknamed The Golden Boy, Fast Freddie, The Elmhurst Express and Fearless Freddy, is a former NASCAR driver from Elmhurst, Illinois. Active from 1958 to 1972, he won 26 races including 1965 Daytona 500.

Early life
Fred Lorenzen was 15 years of age when he and his Elmhurst, Illinois friends competed in a contest to see who could flip a 1937 Plymouth over first by cranking it around in circles. Lorenzen claimed to be the victor of that confrontation.

NASCAR

Early career
After graduating from high school, Lorenzen began racing modifieds and late models, and made his NASCAR debut in 1956 at Langhorne Speedway, finishing 26th after suffering a broken fuel pump, winning $25. He moved to a USAC stock car, and won the 1958 and 1959 championships driving his Talarico Bros. built Chevrolet.

The Holman Moody Years

On Christmas Eve 1960, Lorenzen received a phone call from team owner Ralph Moody that would change his career. Moody asked Lorenzen about becoming his team's lead driver. A surprised Lorenzen accepted, albeit curious as to what he'd done to fulfill Moody's criteria to be part of his team.

In 1961, Lorenzen began winning races in what would become a remarkable career.  For five years from 1961 till 1966, Lorenzen dominated NASCAR like few other drivers ever would winning many major races and defeating the best drivers of his day.

In his maiden season with Holman Moody, Lorenzen won: the Grand National 200 at Martinsville; the Rebel 300 at Darlington and the Festival 250 at Atlanta.  There was no doubt that Lorenzen would challenge the all-time greats for the top prizes in NASCAR.

Lorenzen's winning streak (1962–1967)

In 1962, Lorenzen won the Atlanta 500 and a race at Augusta Speedway.  The 1962 Ford was troubled at the start of the season by inferior aerodynamics, a serious problem that was rectified with a more streamlined roof halfway into the season.

In 1963, Lorenzen soared to the top and became the top money-winner and the first to break the $100,000 barrier in one season.  In that amazing year, Lorenzen won:  the Atlanta 500, the World 600; the Volunteer 500, the Western North Carolina 500; the Mountaineer 300 and the Old Dominion 500 bringing his total winnings to $122,000.

In 1964, Lorenzen won:  the Southeastern 500 at Bristol; the Atlanta 500; the Gwyn Staley 400 at North Wilkesboro; the Virginia 500 at Martinsville; the Rebel 300 at Darlington; the Volunteer 500; the Old Dominion 500 and the National 400 at Charlotte Motor Speedway;  six of those races are current "classics" on the Sprint Cup Circuit as of 2013.

In 1965 Lorenzen won:  the Daytona 500; the Virginia 500; the World 600 and the National 400.

In 1966 Lorenzen won:  the Old Dominion 500 and the American 500 at Rockingham, North Carolina.

In 1967 Lorenzen won:  the Daytona 500 Qualifier (until 1971, the races currently called the Budweiser Duels were points races).

Lorenzen compiled an amazing record of wins that clearly made him the dominant driver of NASCAR during a very significant portion of its Golden Era.

The Yellow Banana
In one race in 1966 at Atlanta Motor Speedway, he drove a Junior Johnson-owned No. 26 Ford due to the Ford boycott of NASCAR for much of the 1966 season, and it is still one of the most talked about vehicles in NASCAR Grand National Competition to this day. The front end of the car was sloped downward, the roofline was lowered, the side windows were narrowed and the windshield was lowered in an aerodynamic position, and the tail was kicked up. Several rival drivers referred to it as "The Yellow Banana," "Junior's Joke," and "The Magnafluxed Monster." Even though it was against the rules NASCAR allowed the car to compete and Lorenzen crashed while leading the Dixie 500 on the 139th lap. One pit crew member said after the incident "No wonder" he said, "I ain't never seen anybody who could drive a banana at 150 mile an hour." NASCAR let this very illegal car run in only one race, in an attempt to bring up attendance, which had suffered due to the Ford boycott.

Comeback
He came back in 1970, driving a Dodge Daytona prepared by Ray Fox in the World 600 (now the Coca-Cola 600), but dropped out while leading on lap 252 of 400 due to engine issues, running in a few more events that year, including substituting for LeeRoy Yarbrough in the Junior Johnson No. 98 Ford Torino Talladega in that year's Southern 500, as Yarbrough had a prior Indy car commitment. In 1971, he moved over to the Ray Nichels/Paul Goldsmith owned No. 99 Plymouth, sponsored by STP. He left that team part way through the season, and was badly injured in a practice crash while trying to drive for the Wood Brothers prior to the Southern 500. In 1972, he hooked up with Hoss Ellington driving a Chevrolet Monte Carlo, to little success.  His last start came at the 1972 Old Dominion 500 at Martinsville Speedway.

Later life

Lorenzen now lives in assisted living in a suburb of Chicago surrounded by his family.  In his heyday from 1962–65, Lorenzen was the top driver in NASCAR.  On the super speedways, Lorenzen defeated all of his competition to compile an unprecedented streak of wins in major races.  Racing for money instead of points, Lorenzen never competed for the annual Grand National championship, but he won the big races that made him the uncrowned King of NASCAR during its golden years.  Lorenzen's countless fans waited for a long time for Lorenzen's brilliant career to be recognized with his induction into the NASCAR Hall of Fame.

Awards
He was inducted in the Motorsports Hall of Fame of America in 2001.
He was named one of NASCAR's 50 Greatest Drivers in 1998.
He was inducted into the NASCAR Hall of Fame in January 2015.

Quotes 
"When NASCAR lost Fireball Roberts it was like Santa Claus doesn't exist at Christmas and it just took everything out of the race"—Thoughts on Fireball Roberts' death.

Motorsports career results

NASCAR
(key) (Bold – Pole position awarded by qualifying time. Italics – Pole position earned by points standings or practice time. * – Most laps led.)

Grand National Series

Winston Cup Series

Daytona 500

References

External links

Fred Lorenzen Wins

1934 births
International Motorsports Hall of Fame inductees
Living people
NASCAR drivers
People from Elmhurst, Illinois
Racing drivers from Chicago
Racing drivers from Illinois
USAC Stock Car drivers
NASCAR Hall of Fame inductees